Stony Creek Plantation, also known as Shell House, is a historic plantation house located at DeWitt, Dinwiddie County, Virginia. The original section was built about 1750, and is a -story, three-bay, center-hall plan house with a two-story perpendicular section added in 1872.  The house is "T" shaped and features massive brick chimneys.

It was listed on the National Register of Historic Places in 2003.

References

Houses on the National Register of Historic Places in Virginia
National Register of Historic Places in Dinwiddie County, Virginia
Houses completed in 1750
Plantation houses in Virginia
Georgian architecture in Virginia
Houses in Dinwiddie County, Virginia